The 1916 Florida Gators football team represented the University of Florida in the sport of American football during the 1916 college football season. The season was C. J. McCoy's third and last as the head coach of the Florida Gators football team. Depleted of first-string football talent and lacking depth, McCoy's 1916 Florida Gators suffered through a disastrous season in which they posted an overall record of 0–5 and a Southern Intercollegiate Athletic Association (SIAA) conference record of 0–4 while scoring a total of three points, leading to the head coach's dismissal.

Florida football's first losing season was notable for the first meetings with future Southeastern Conference rivals Tennessee and Alabama.

Before the season
Florida had posted a 9-5 record over the previous two seasons under Coach McCoy. Believing that he had the makings of a great squad, he arranged the most ambitious and difficult football schedule to date.  McCoy's plans were thwarted, however, by a series of injuries and academic ineligibility problems, beginning when the Gators' starting quarterback, Rammy Ramsdell, broke his leg playing on Florida's baseball team and missed the entire football season.

The team  suffered the transfer of guard Ham Dowling, and tackle Everett Yon was called by the National Guard to defend the Mexican border. Due to a shortage of men, captain Rex Farrior, previously a center, moved to fullback.

Mercer scheduled a game with Florida, but several Mercer linemen were behind in their studies, and the game was canceled.

Schedule

Season summary

Georgia

Sources:

The season opened with a 21–0 loss to Georgia in Athens. The contest was scoreless in the first half. Georgia had to send in two stars who were resting with dislocated shoulders. Walter Neville scored the game's first touchdown.

The starting lineup was F. Henderson (left end), Baker (left tackle), Duvan (left guard), Robles (center), Golsby (right guard), Perry (right tackle), Wilkinson (right end), Fuller (quarterback), Wilson (left halfback), Hatcher (right halfback), Farrier (fullback).

Alabama
Led by Cecil Creen, the Crimson Tide beat the Gators 16–0 in the two's first ever meeting. Creen twice tackled Florida's Ward from behind with a clear field ahead. It was the Gators' first loss at University Field.

Tennessee

Sources:

The SIAA champion Tennessee Volunteers blanked the Gators  in Tampa 24 to 0 in the two rivals first-ever meeting. Buck Hatcher's punts were the feature of the contest.

The starting lineup was F. Henderson (left end), Baker (left tackle), Perry (left guard), Robles (center), O. DeVane (right guard), Goldsby (right tackle), Wood (right end), Fuller (quarterback), Sparkman (left halfback), Wilson (right halfback), Farrier (fullback).

Auburn

Sources:

The Auburn Plainsmen beat the Gators 20–0. Auburn's fullback Scott was the star of the contest. The second touchdown was a 50-yard interception return by Godwin.

The starting lineup was F. Henderson (left end), Bankston (left tackle), Rosenthal (left guard), Robles (center), Stockton (right guard), Goldsby (right tackle), Wood (right end), Fuller (quarterback), Sparkman (left halfback), Hatcher (right halfback), Farrier (fullback).

at Indiana

Sources:

Captain Rex Farrior broke his leg in the final two minutes of the final game, a 14–3 loss at Indiana, the only game in which the Gators scored when Paul Baker made a field goal. Up at the half 3–0, Florida lineman Orryl Robles was ejected, and Florida never recovered.

The starting lineup was F. Henderson (left end), Baker (left tackle), Rosenthal (left guard), Robles (center), Stockton (right guard), Goldsby (right tackle), Wood (right end), Fuller (quarterback), Sparkman (left halfback), Hatcher (right halfback), Farrier (fullback).

Postseason
C. J. McCoy finished his three-year tenure as the Gators' coach with an overall record of 9–10.

Personnel

Line

Backfield

Coaching staff
Head coach: Charles J. McCoy
Manager: W. D. Payne

Notes

References

Bibliography
 
 

Florida
Florida Gators football seasons
College football winless seasons
Florida Gators football